John Giffard Ward was Dean of Lincoln from 1845   to 1860. A Fellow of New College, Oxford, he had previously held incumbencies in Chelmsford and Westminster. He died on 27 February 1860.

Notes

Deans of Lincoln
Fellows of New College, Oxford
1860 deaths
Year of birth unknown